Sylvie Tolmont (born 9 October 1962) is a French politician from the Socialist Party, who has been the member of the National Assembly for Sarthe's 4th constituency since 2012.

On 9 March 2020, during the COVID-19 pandemic in France, she tested positive for the virus.

In the 2022 French legislative election, she stood for re-election opposed to NUPES. She lost her seat coming third place in the first round.

References 

Living people
1962 births
Women members of the National Assembly (France)
21st-century French women politicians
Socialist Party (France) politicians
People from Le Mans

People from Sarthe
Deputies of the 14th National Assembly of the French Fifth Republic
Deputies of the 15th National Assembly of the French Fifth Republic